Hirrlingen is a municipality in the district of Tübingen in Baden-Württemberg in Germany. Hirrlingen is located about 15 kilometers southwest from Tübingen.

References 

Municipalities in Baden-Württemberg
Tübingen (district)